The 2022–23 season is the 140th season in the existence of Bristol Rovers Football Club and the club's first season back in League One since the 2020–21 season following their promotion in the previous season. In addition to the league, they will also compete in the 2022–23 FA Cup, the 2022–23 EFL Cup and the 2022–23 EFL Trophy.

Transfers

In

Out

Loans in

Loans out

Pre-season and friendlies

Competitions

Overall record

League One

League table

Results summary

Results by round

Matches

The league fixtures were announced on 23 June 2022.

FA Cup

The draw for the First Round was made on 17 October 2022 by Alan Smith and Dion Dublin. The draw for the Second ROund was made on 7 November 2022 by Jermaine Beckford and Mickey Thomas.

EFL Cup

EFL Trophy

On 20 June 2022, the Gas were drawn in a group with Plymouth Argyle and Swindon Town, the final group place being taken by one of the invited clubs, later confirmed to be Crystal Palace U21. In the second round, Rovers were drawn away to Colchester United.

Statistics
Players with squad numbers struck through and marked  left the club during the playing season.
Players with names in italics and marked * were on loan from another club for the whole of their season with Bristol Rovers.

|}

Goals Record

Disciplinary Record

References

Bristol Rovers
Bristol Rovers F.C. seasons
English football clubs 2022–23 season